Petra Vinšová (born 15 November 1991 in Prague) is a Czech curler.

At the national level, she is a three-time Czech mixed champion (2015, 2018, 2019).

Personal life
As of 2020, she is a PhD candidate in polar science.

Teams

Women's

Mixed

Mixed doubles

References

External links
 
 

1991 births
Living people
Sportspeople from Prague
Czech female curlers
Czech curling champions